Margaret Hilary Millington (March 22, 1944 – March 1973) was an English-born mathematician.

She was born Margaret Hilary Ashworth in Halifax, Yorkshire, the daughter of the local assistant head postmaster, and was educated there. She continued her studies at St Mary's College, Durham and went on to Oxford University, where she earned a PhD in 1968 with A. O. L. Atkin as her advisor. Also, in 1968, she married Lieutenant A.H. Millington. She was awarded a two-year Science Research Council Fellowship which allowed her to pursue research at any university. During her husband's two-year posting in Germany, she taught mathematics at an Army Education Centre there.

She died in Germany due to a brain tumour at the age of 29.

Although her career was cut short, in 1983, the London Mathematical Society organized a symposium on modular forms. During the symposium, the importance of her doctoral thesis and post-doctoral research became clear. The work that she had started during her fellowship was picked up and pursued by other mathematicians, leading to a resurgence in the field.

In a tribute to Millington, Atkin said "I have no doubt that, had she lived, she would have made exciting original contributions to a field which has at last come into its own again, after nearly a quarter century in the doldrums, and where there are now at least twenty first rate people of her generation working actively."

References 

1944 births
1973 deaths
20th-century English mathematicians
Deaths from brain tumor
British women mathematicians
20th-century women mathematicians